Aforia goodei, common name Goode's turrid, is a species of sea snail, a marine gastropod mollusk in the family Turridae, the turrids.

Description
The length of the shell varies between 50 mm and 90 mm.

(Original description) The shell is large and thin. Its color is white, with a tinge of pale orange in the throat and on the columella. It contains eight (or more) whorls, the protoconch wanting in the specimens. The surface is generally slightly eroded, glistening when perfect. The spiral sculpture below the periphery consists of narrow shallow grooves separating wider, half obsolete threads. At the periphery is an obtuse carina which is sharper on the early whorls. Behind this is a wide shallow sulcus, behind which the whorl rounds to the distinct but unchannelled suture. On the upper or posterior part of the whorl the fine spirals are perceptible but fainter than in front of the periphery. The transverse sculpture consists only of incremental lines. The aperture is elongated moderately wide. The anal notch is wide and rounded. The fasciole is slightly raised, not strongly differentiated. The body of the shell has a thin transparent glaze. The columella is strong, obliquely truncate, flaring, almost pervious, anteriorly more or less tinged with pale orange. The siphonal canal is long, thin, shallow and slightly recurved. The outer lip is prominent below the periphery, thin and sharp.

The operculum has an apical nucleus but the succeeding growth showing a tendency to a slight spirality. With subsequent growth this becomes enclosed by additions made all around the margin, and the adult operculum appears buccinoid, having a buccinoid outline, in the lower right hand part of which the nuclear part is inclosed. This singular form of operculum is not a deformity, but is common to several of the species of Leucosyrinx in which the author has been able to examine this appendage. It is a feature which by gradual stages, represented by different species, approaches the normal Pleurotomoid operculum.

Distribution
This species occurs in the Pacific Ocean from British Columbia to Chile.

References

External links
 

goodei
Gastropods described in 1881